Carlos Roberto Coelho de Mattos Júnior (born 8 February 1982), or simply Carlos Jordy, is a Brazilian deputy for the state of Rio de Janeiro. He was elected in 2018.

Born in Niterói, he is affiliated to the Liberal Party (PL).

He is anti-communist and an ally of conservative former president Jair Bolsonaro.

External links

References 

Living people
1982 births
21st-century Brazilian politicians
Liberal Party (Brazil, 2006) politicians
Brazilian anti-communists
Members of the Chamber of Deputies (Brazil) from Rio de Janeiro (state)
People from Niterói